Bhaupur is a village (gram/ gaon) in Akbarpur, Ambedkar Nagar district of Uttar Pradesh, India, located  in the east of Akbarpur town. It is the part of eleven   gram sabha , with 1,750 people, which comes under the gram panchayat (local government), Rukunuddinpur.

Society
Bhaupur is home to various sections of Indian society. It is a village with traditional culture, which is transforming slowly. The villagers are mostly peasants and workers.

Schools
Bhaupur has one primary school controlled by Government of Uttar Pradesh. The total strength of students in the school is seventy-five (academic year 2009-10).

Transport
Bhaupur is indirectly connected with Akbarpur, the district headquarters of Ambedkar Nagar through bus and small transport vehicles. Commuters and villagers have to leave bus or small transport vehicles at Kurki Bazar (4 km east of district headquarters) and walk towards south, pitch road headed to the village.

Nearest places
Rajesultanpur
Baskhari
Akbarpur
Tanda

Nearest Higher Education Institute
The institute for higher education, Ramabai Government Post Graduate College (for Women) is located 3.5 km from west of Bhaupur village towards district headquarters.

Nearest railway station
The nearest Indian Railways Station is Akbarpur railway station  (ABP) with distance of 8.5 km.

Nearest hospital
The district hospital Akbarpur has the facilities of caring patients through emergency services.

References 

Villages in Ambedkar Nagar district

it:Akbarpur (Ambedkar Nagar)
sv:Akbarpur, Ambedkar Nagar